Jacques Grinberg (Yaacov Grinberg (10 January 1941 – 5 May 2011) was a Neo-expressionist painter and printmaker.

Biography
1941-1960
Jacques Grinberg was born in 1941, in Bulgaria, and lived in Sofia during the war years. His father, Natan Grinberg, a member of the Communist Party in his youth, held a high position in the leadership of Communist Bulgaria after the war. In 1954, the family moved to Israel and settled in Bat Yam. On his arrival, Jacques went to school in a kibbutz, and at a young age began studying art at the Avni School in Tel Aviv.

He probably was not exposed directly to the horrors of the Holocaust, but the subject was not repressed, certainly not by his father, who already in 1945 had published a book of documents attesting to the attempts of the Bulgarian fascist government to eliminate Bulgarian Jewry and to the involvement of the army and the police in the expulsion and extermination of the Jews of Thrace and Macedonia. After the book disappeared from the bookshops in Bulgaria, he published it again in Israel (in Bulgarian).

1961-1970
In 1961, Natan Grinberg published another book in Israel, with a painting by his son on its cover. Jacques’s communistic world view and his acute sensitivity to the events of the time and to man’s fate were an inseparable part of the habitus he grew up in, and are embedded in his work. After showing his works in several exhibitions in Tel Aviv galleries, Jacques moved to Paris in 1962, and in a short time found his place among the first artists who promoted the “New Figuration” orientation, which proposed a contemporary painting that struck out against the abstract, which had taken over everywhere.

Grinberg’s paintings – large in format, bold in their colors – focused on human and animal images, and were highly successful. He was represented by a leading gallery and his paintings were shown in well-regarded exhibitions. But the failure of the Students’ Revolt in 1968 and the collapse of the gallery that represented him (and sold his paintings at a loss, which broke the market for his works) created a new reality for him, and he found it difficult to recover.

1971-1983
Following the closure of the Galerie Schoeller Jacques Grinberg experienced significant financial difficulty and went to live in Israel for a year. His friend, the Israeli poet Meir Wieseltier, chose several of his drawings and lithographs for the covers of his poetic books and for the first issue of Proza 21, an Israeli literary magazine.

On his return to Paris he rented a studio in Saint-Germain-des-Prés. His scope of inspiration widened and he began to include new influences such as the Kabbalah and Tao. His wide-ranging pictorial research became increasingly exploratory.

In 1972, the Galerie de France published, in partnership with the Atelier Clot, and showed lithographs by Jacques Grinberg as well as Pierre Alechinsky, Erró, Asger Jorn, Roberto Matta, Roland Topor and Maurice Wyckaert.

The following year he worked again with Jo Verbrugghen, the Belgian dealer, on a solo exhibition, which was held at the Sint Pietersabdij Museum in Ghent. In 1974, he returned to the Montparnasse neighbourhood, where he had studios in the rue des Plantes and then in rue Campagne Première. At that time Jacques Grinberg's life was particularly hectic and he briefly struggled with psychiatric issues. Supported by his family, he continued to paint. He travelled in Mexico and Greece and brought back numerous ideas and works made in those countries. He also lived and worked for a while in London.

1984-1994
A fresh start in Israel brought about three solo exhibitions, initially at the Dvir Gallery in 1984 and 1985 and then at the 27 Gallery in 1987. Jacques Grinberg's work appealed to an enthusiastic audience and enjoyed widespread media coverage.

In 1987 Grinberg returned to France. He made contact with Cérès Franco, a friend of twenty years' standing who was then director of the Galerie L'Œil-de-Bœuf in Paris. She supported him and organized four solo exhibitions for him between 1988 and 1994.

In 1991 he settled in Malakoff in the Paris suburbs.

1995-2011
During this period, Jacques Grinberg became increasingly reclusive and devoted his time exclusively to his creative work.

His pictorial production was self-assured and intense. He started to write and published several collections. A number of young artists sought him out, and of these several were greatly influenced by his thinking. In 1997, the Galerie Jacques in Ann Arbor (Michigan, USA) exhibited his engravings. In 2002, the Galerie Idées d'artistes organised what would be his last solo exhibition, entitled Véhément, mélancolique. Some of his works are still regularly shown throughout France at public exhibitions of the Cérès Franco collection. In 2008, the Galerie Polad-Hardouin – wishing to pay homage to the New Figuration painters of the 1960s – organised a manifesto exhibition entitled New Figuration: Act III. Jacques Grinberg showed works from this period in the exhibition alongside others including Maryan, Michel Macréau (1935-1995), Paul Rebeyrolle, Antonio Saura, John Christoforou and Bengt Lindström.

Resolutely independent and passionate about painting, he continued his creative explorations with great freedom until his death on 31 May 2011.

Jacques Grinberg died in Paris. A bilingual catalogue accompanies the exhibition at the Mishkan Museum of Art (Ein Harod (Meuhad)), in collaboration with The Homme bleu Foundation. In addition to texts by the curators, the catalogue contains an article by the poet Meir Wieseltier. Further exhibitions Of Grinberg's paintings are planned in 2016-2017 in France (Museum of Modern Art City of Paris, collector's donations) and Bulgaria".

Individual exhibitions

1963 Galerij Kaleidoskoop, Gand, Belgium
1964 Galerie Andre Schoeller Jr Paris, France
1965 Galerie Andre Schoeller Jr Paris, France
1973 Musee Sint Pietersaldig, Gand, Belgium
1984 Dvir Gallery, Tel Aviv, Israel
1985 Dvir Gallery, Tel Aviv, Israel
1987 Gallery 27, Tel Aviv, Israel
1988 Galerie L'Œil de Bœuf, Cérès Franco, Paris, France
1990 Galerie L'Œil de Bœuf, Cérès Franco, Paris, France
1991 Galerie L'Œil de Bœuf, Cérès Franco, Paris, France
1994 Galerie L'Œil de Bœuf, Cérès Franco, Paris, France
2002 "Véhément Mélancolique", Galerie Idées d'artistes, Paris, France
2012 Exposition rétrospective 1961-2011, Cité internationale des arts in Paris
2014 "A la force des pinceaux", Centre culturel Bulgare, Paris, France
 2015 "Jacques Grinberg - Paintings", Museum of Art Ein Harod, Israel
 2016 "entre chair et esprit", Maison des Arts de Châtillon, France
 2016 "Un peintre sans concession", Musée d'Art Moderne de la Ville de Paris, France
 2016 "Jacques Grinberg, exposition monographique", Galerie La minotaure et Galerie Alain Le Gaillard, Paris, France

Main group exhibitions

1959 Katz Gallery, Tel-Aviv, Israel
1961 Chemerinsky Art Gallery, Tel-Aviv, Israel
1963 "Quatre jeunes peintres israéliens", Galleri 27, Oslo, Norway
1963 Galleria Privada, Madrid, Spain
1963 "Art graphique juif", Librairie La Proue, Bruxelles, Belgium
1963 Peintres israéliens à Paris, Galerie Kaleidoskoop, Gand, Belgium 
1964 "Moralités", Galeries Lahumiere-Levin, Paris, France
1964 "Rencontres", Galerie Krugier, Genève, Switzerland
1964 "28 Peintres d'aujourd'hui", Galerie Andre Schoeller, Paris, France
1964 Salon de Mai, Musée d’art moderne de la Ville de Paris
1964 Salon Grands et Jeunes d’Aujourd’hui, Musée d’art moderne de la Ville de Paris, France
1965 Salon de Mai, Musée d’art moderne de la Ville de Paris, France
1965 Salon Grands et Jeunes d’Aujourd’hui, Musée d’art moderne de la Ville de Paris, France
1965 Salon de la Jeune peinture, Musée d’art moderne de la Ville de Paris, France
1966 Esperanto Gallery, New York, United States
1966 "Galeries pilotes", Musée de Lausanne, Switzerland
1966  Salon Grands et Jeunes d’Aujourd’hui, Musée d’art moderne de la Ville de Paris, France
1967 "Figures et histoire", Galerie Heide Hildebrand, Klagenfurt, Austria
1968 Moderna Galerija Rijeka, Yugoslavia
1969 Galeria Ivan Spence, Ibizza, Spain
1969 Galerie Claude Levin, Paris, France
1970 Galerie T. Haarlem, Netherlands 
1973 Galerie de France, Paris, France
1991 "Nouvelle figuration version 90", Galerie L'Œil de Bœuf, Paris, France
1992 "Petits formats", Galerie L'Œil de Bœuf, Paris, France
1993 "l'Anormalita dell'Arte", Refettorio delle stelline, Milan, Italy
1996 "Boomerang" Paris, France
1997 Galerie Jacques, Ann Arbord, Michigan, USA 
1999 "Biz'art", Bures sur Yvette, France
1999 "L'arte del's 70", Musée d'Art contemporain d'Ibizza, Spain
2000 Collection Cérès Franco, Miramas, France
2001 "L'art sous pression", Collection Cérès Franco, espace Écureuil, Toulouse France
2001 "Entre noirs et blancs", Galerie Idées d'artistes, Paris, France
2003 "Désirs Brut", des arts plastiques en Île-de-France, Les Ulis, France
2003 "Désirs Brut", Kremlin Bicêtre, France
2003 "Entre noirs et blancs", Galerie Idées d'artistes Paris, France
2004 "Un art de l'imaginaire débridé", collection Cérès Franco, Grand théâtre d'Angers, France
2004-2005 "Fragments d'Artistes", Galerie Idées d'Artistes, Paris, France
2005 "Les Imagiers Débridés", Collection Cérès Franco, Carcassonne, France
2008 "Nouvelle figuration : Acte III", Galerie Polad-Hardouin, Paris, France
2009 "Désirs Bruts", Collection Cérès Franco, Bancaja-Fundacion Caja Castellon, Spain
2013 "Den nya figurationen", World art day 15 avril, Härnösand, Sweden
2013 "Désirs Bruts", Collection Cérès Franco, Maison des Arts, Châtillon, France
2014 "Retour sur quelques artistes de la Nouvelle Figuration", Galerie Polad-Hardouin, Paris, France
2015 "En grand format", exposition inaugurale de la Coopérative-Collection Cérès Franco, Montolieu, France
2017 Collection Laurent Dumas, Villa Emerige, Paris
2016 Perpetuum Mobile, Collection Cérès Franco, Galerie Dominique Polad-Hardouin, Paris

References and sources
References

Sources

 Benezit Dictionary of Artists, 2006, site Oxford Index (subscription or library membership required)

External links
 Personal Website(jacquesgrinberg.com)
 Jacques Grinberg; video, vimeo.com

1941 births
2011 deaths
Artists from Sofia
Bulgarian Jews
Bulgarian emigrants to Israel
20th-century French painters
20th-century French male artists
21st-century French painters
21st-century French male artists
20th-century Israeli painters
21st-century Israeli painters
Modern painters
Modern printmakers
Abstract expressionist artists
Abstract painters
French abstract artists
Neo-expressionist artists